The 1890–91 Scottish Districts season is a record of all the  rugby union matches for Scotland's district teams.

History

Glasgow District won the Inter-City match.

North of Scotland District arranged a number of matches this season.

Midlands District arranged a New Year fixture against Edinburgh Academicals.

Results

Inter-City

Glasgow District:

Edinburgh District:

Other Scottish matches

North of Scotland District:

Midlands District: 

North of Scotland District:

Glasgow District: 

East of Scotland District:

West of Scotland District:

English matches

No other District matches played.

International matches

No touring matches this season.

References

1890–91 in Scottish rugby union
Scottish Districts seasons